Sterling Bank of Asia is a savings bank in the Philippines principally owned by the JTKC Group of Companies, Surewell Equities, and Star Equities engaged in diverse industries ranging from logistics to finance, real estate, manufacturing, hotel and resort properties. It was established on 30 March 2007 in response to the Philippine government's mandate to create specialized financial institutions that would support the development and growth of the small and medium enterprise sector.

As of 2022, it is the sixth largest thrift bank in the Philippines in terms of total assets. It started to operate with seven branches in 2007 prior to its acquisition of Centennial Savings Bank in 2009. As of today, it has forty eight branches all throughout the country.

See also
BancNet
List of banks in the Philippines

References

Banks of the Philippines
Banks established in 2007
Companies based in San Juan, Metro Manila